Agnieszka Tomczak (born 29 May 1975 in Bydgoszcz) is a Polish rower. She completed in the women's single scull event in the 2000 Summer Olympics.

References

External links 
 
 
 
 

1975 births
Living people
Polish female rowers
Olympic rowers of Poland
Rowers at the 2000 Summer Olympics
Sportspeople from Bydgoszcz